Bullgill or Bull Gill was a railway station on the Maryport and Carlisle Railway (M&CR) serving Bullgill in Cumbria. The station was opened by the M&CR in 1840 and lay in the Parish of Oughterside and Allerby. It closed in 1960

History 
Bullgill station was opened by the Maryport & Carlisle Railway (M&CR) in 1840. At grouping in 1923 the M&CR became a part of the London, Midland and Scottish Railway. It was closed to passenger traffic by the British Transport Commission on 7 March 1960 and to all traffic four years later.  Much of the station has since been demolished, but remnants of the southbound platform still survive and can be seen from passing trains.

The main Carlisle-Maryport line (completed in 1845) remains open and forms part of the Cumbrian Coast Line between Carlisle and Barrow in Furness. Prior to closure John Joseph Metcalfe was the Station Master. In 2009 the local community recommended that the station should be re-opened.

Though this line was built primarily to handle iron-ore traffic, it was also used by passenger services. These started from Maryport and ran north to Bullgill, where they reversed. They then continued south to Brigham, where another reversal was necessary before they ran onwards to their destination at Cockermouth. The need for these reversals meant that the modest  journey took 50 minutes to complete. This line was closed to passengers by the LMS on 29 April 1935 and subsequently dismantled.

References

Sources

Further reading

External links
 Bullgill Station
 Bullgill railway station ruins.

Disused railway stations in Cumbria
Former Maryport and Carlisle Railway stations
Railway stations in Great Britain opened in 1840
Railway stations in Great Britain closed in 1960
Crosscanonby